On 18 January 2020, a drone and missile attack on a mosque in a military camp near Marib killed at least 111 Yemeni soldiers during evening prayers. Dozens more were injured. No group claimed responsibility, although the Houthi movement is suspected and was accused of carrying out the attack.

Attack
The attack was carried out using ballistic missiles and drones. The target was a mosque located on the grounds of a military training camp. It was attacked during evening prayers when dozens of people were inside praying.

See also
 August 2020 Ma'rib attack

References

Attacks in Asia in 2020
Attacks on buildings and structures in Yemen
Attacks on mosques in Asia
Houthi insurgency in Yemen
Mass murder in 2020
Marib Governorate
Military operations involving Yemen
Yemeni Civil War (2014–present)
Massacres in Yemen